The Portuguese Football Federation Cup was a competition organized by the Portuguese Football Federation. It was only played in the 1976–77 season. There was an exclusive edition for each of the three top Portuguese divisions, resulting in three champions from different divisions.

This cup is not to be confused with the actual national cup, the Taça de Portugal, despite both being run by the PFF.

Format 
Each of the three top divisions had their own "Portuguese Football Federation Cup". The format was the following:
 Group Phase: Teams were split into 4 groups of 4 teams.
 Knockout Phase: Group winners face each other. Both Semi-finals and the final are one-legged fixtures.

Taça FPF

First Division

Group Phase

Knockout Phase 

SC Braga: 3 vs FC Porto: 1.
Atlético Clube de Portugal: 1 vs Grupo Desportivo Estoril Praia: 2.

Finals:

SC Braga: 2 vs Grupo Desportivo Estoril Praia: 0.

Second Division

Group Phase 

The Almada-Sesimbra match was not validated by FPF.

Knockout Phase

Finals 

Famalicão: 0  vs BARREIRENSE: 1.

Third Division

Group Phase

Second Phase 

Bragança: 3 Águeda: 0.
Lamego desqualificado.

Final 

GD BRAGANÇA: 1 Elvas: 0.

Champions Table

External links
 Competition page on the FPF website:  (Portuguese)
 Arquivos da Bola:  (Portuguese)

Defunct football cup competitions in Portugal
1976–77 in Portuguese football